Tobias Erler (born 17 May 1979) is a German former road cyclist.

Major results

2003
 1st Stages 2 & 5 Tour de Taiwan
2005
 1st Stages 1, 2, 3 & 5 Tour de Taiwan
2006
 1st  Overall Tour de Korea
1st Stage 3
 2nd Time trial, World University Cycling Championships
2007
 1st Rund um den Sachsenring
2010
 2nd Overall International Presidency Tour
1st Stages 1 & 2
 3rd Tour de Mumbai
2011
 1st  Overall Tour of Thailand
1st Prologue
 1st Stages 1 & 8 Tour de Korea
 1st Stage 2 Tour of Iran (Azerbaijan) (TTT)

References

External links

1979 births
Living people
German male cyclists
Place of birth missing (living people)